The CMLL International Gran Prix is an annual tournament held by the Mexican professional wrestling promotion Consejo Mundial de Lucha Libre (CMLL), that was held from 1994 to 2008, although there was no tournament in 1999, 2000, 2001 and 2004. The tournament was inspired by New Japan Pro-Wrestling's "International Wrestling Gran Prix" tournament in the 1980s.

From 1994 until 1998 the Gran Prix was a single elimination tournament that featured a mixture of Mexican and international wrestlers, some who worked for CMLL regularly and some that were invited specifically for the tournament. From 2002 and on the format was changed to a torneo cibernetico, a 16-man match with one side representing Mexico and the other side being composed of "international" wrestlers.

Three people have won the Gran Prix twice, Rayo de Jalisco Jr., Último Guerrero and Volador Jr. The most recent Gran Prix was in 2019 where wrestlers from the United States and Puerto Rico participated on the "International" side. Volador Jr. defeated Negro Casas to win the Gran Prix.

Tournament winners

References

 
Recurring events established in 1994